Clionella striolata is a species of sea snail, a marine gastropod mollusk in the family Clavatulidae.

Description
The size of an adult shell varies between 14 mm and 22 mm.

The squat, bucciniform shell has convex whorls and a rather large aperture. The siphonal canal is barely notched. The anal sinus is very shallow. The arcuate ribs number 14-19 per whorl, but becoming sometimes obsolete on later whorls. The color of the shell consists of patches of yellowish-brown.

Characteristic for this species is that the spiral sculpture shows 4–5 well-spaced grooves per whorl.  Furthermore, the subsutural cord is feeble.

Distribution
This marine species occurs in lower midtidal rock pools off Namaqualand to Cape Hangklip, South Africa.

References

 Turton, W. H. 1932. The marine shells of Port Alfred, South Africa. London: Oxford University Press. xvi, 331. pp.

External links
 

Endemic fauna of South Africa
striolata
Gastropods described in 1932